Cervignano may refer to:

 Cervignano d'Adda, municipality in the province of Lodi, in the region Lombardy, Italy
 Cervignano del Friuli, municipality in the province of Udine, in the region Friuli-Venezia Giulia, Italy